Siassie Kenneally (29 May 1969–2018) was an Inuit artist from Cape Dorset (Kinngait), Northwest Territories (now Nunavut. Kenneally was known for her drawings. Kenneally was a cousin to Shuvinai Ashoona and Annie Pootoogook. She was the granddaughter of artists Sheouak Petaulassie and Pitseolak Ashoona.

Her work is included in the collections of the National Gallery of Canada and the Dennos Museum.

References

1969 births
2018 deaths
20th-century Canadian artists
20th-century Canadian women artists
21st-century Canadian artists
21st-century Canadian women artists
Inuit artists
Artists from Nunavut
People from Kinngait
Inuit women